Barrowhill is a village in Kent, England, between Ashford and Folkestone.

Villages in Kent